Schumacheria castaneifolia is a species of plant in the family Dilleniaceae. It is endemic to Sri Lanka.

References

 http://www.pdn.ac.lk/purse/Proceedings/2011/ns/ns_24.pdf
 http://www.theplantlist.org/tpl/record/kew-2593565
 http://www.mpnet.iora-rcstt.org/node/2788
 https://www.gbif.org/species/5680868/

Flora of Sri Lanka
Dilleniaceae
Critically endangered plants
Taxa named by Martin Vahl